E. japonica  may refer to:
 Eisenia japonica, an earthworm species in the genus Eisenia
 Eriobotrya japonica, the loquat, a fruit tree species indigenous to southeastern China
 Eriocheir japonica, a crab species in the genus Eriocheir
 Eristalis japonica, a hoverfly species in the genus Eristalis
 Eristalinus japonica, a hoverfly species in the genus Eristalinus
 Euaresta japonica, a fruit fly species
 Eubalaena japonica, the North Pacific right whale, a very large robust baleen whale species that was common in the North Pacific
 Eurya japonica, an ornamental plant species

Synonyms
 Eutrema japonica, a synonym for Wasabia japonica, the wasabi or Japanese horseradish, a cultivated plant species

See also
 Japonica (disambiguation)